Diddlebock may refer to:
The Sin of Harold Diddlebock, 1947 comedy film directed by Preston Sturges
Harry Diddlebock, (1854–1900), sportswriter and Major League Baseball manager